is a Japanese aikido teacher holding the rank of 8th dan in the Aikikai . 

Born in Fukushima, Japan, his first contact with aikido was in 1963 at the Asia University in Tokyo where he followed a class taught by Nobuyoshi Tamura.  The next year, Tamura introduced him to the Aikikai Hombu Dojo where he started training assiduously under Morihei Ueshiba, Kisshomaru Ueshiba and other prominent Hombu instructors. He officially became an uchideshi in 1967 after graduating from university.

On 19 April 1970, shortly after the death of Morihei Ueshiba, Suganuma was sent to Fukuoka by Kisshomaru Ueshiba as the Aikikai's representative for the Kyūshū district.  He is the founder and dojocho of Aikido Shoheijuku Dojo, which today encompasses about 70 dojo and 4000 students. Although primarily based in Fukuoka, he is regularly invited to give aikido seminars around the world. Seminar locations have included Vancouver, Norway, the Netherlands, Israel, and Beijing.
 
He received his 8th dan Aikikai in 2001.

He is also a well-known shodo master and regularly practices zen meditation and yoga.

References

External links

 
Shohei Juku Aikido Canada
Vancouver Aikido page
Photos and video from Beijing University seminar
aikiweb.com Image Gallery

Dutch branch Shoheijuku: Aikido Itokan Organisation
 Interview with Aikido Shihan Morito Suganuma - Part 1
 Interview with Aikido Shihan Morito Suganuma - Part 2

Japanese aikidoka
Living people
1942 births
Shihan